Deviations Project is a British electronic music group composed of producer Dave Williams and violinist Oliver Lewis.  The group blends elements of classical music with electronica; pieces such as Tchaikovsky's "Swan Lake", Bizet's "Carmen" and Bach's "Sonata in Gm" are recreated with modern music technology.  Contemporary compositions, including Dave Williams' own songs, John Williams’ "Theme From Schindler's List" and Fleetwood Mac's "Albatross" were integrated with classical works on the group's first self-titled LP. They have also released the Christmas album Adeste Fiddles (a play on Adeste Fideles) and a second album, Ivory Bow.

Biographies

Dave Williams
After receiving a degree in Art and Design, Dave Williams began his musical career playing with best friend John Deacon, the bassist of Queen, in several different bands. When the magic of touring began to lose its charm Williams opened his own recording studio and became a songwriter for Warner/Chappell. Williams has created musical jingles for TV & Radio that can be heard all over the world including his first big time job, a radio jingle for Radio Rentals with session vocalist Tony Head (who later went on to work on Buffy the Vampire Slayer).  Dave became the Music Director for the long running international smash hit Spirit of the Dance, which has four touring shows in the US and two international touring groups. Formed in 1996, Spirit of the Dance is a foot-stomping international production featuring a spectacular display of traditional Irish culture that has thrilled audiences all over the world.  Williams's own compositions have most recently been performed by Oliver Lewis and broadcast to over two billion people in Asia.

Oliver Lewis
International violin virtuoso Oliver Lewis is hailed by the Guardian as "Magnificent talent, he took the audience into another world." Even from a young age Oliver Lewis’ talent for the violin was undeniable. As a child prodigy he was one of the first leaders of the National Children's Orchestra of Great Britain, making his concert debut at the age of twelve. Scholarships from the Purcell School of Music, the Guildhall School of Music and the Bern Conservatory opened doors for Lewis, enabling him to be trained by great talents and educators of music. His professional career began as a concert soloist with the Bern Symphony Orchestra where he played Ravel's "Tzigane" and Bruch's "G Minor Violin Concerto." This led him to be leader of the Heidelberg Chamber Orchestra, touring Europe and performing Vivaldi's "Four Seasons" over four hundred times.  

Although Lewis has proven himself a virtuoso of the classics, he also has mastered stylistic diversity. Star of the international smash hit Spirit of the Dance, he performed a spectacular display of traditional Irish culture that has thrilled audiences. Spirit of the Dance has become one of the most successful shows in the world, seen by millions of people. As an avid fan of new music, many modern day composers have written pieces specifically for him to play. These pieces include "Insomnia" by British composer John Pickard and Nicholas Brown's "Silence is Golden". With his piano trio he has recorded two new scores to the classic silent movies Lady Windermere's Fan and After Death, released worldwide by the British Film Institute. 

Lewis's concerts have taken him to Europe, the United States, Australia, New Zealand, South Africa, Asia, Brazil, and Trinidad, where he performed for the president of Trinidad and Tobago alongside Trinidad's soprano star Natalia Dopwell. Currently, Lewis plays regular recitals at the Wigmore Hall and with the Royal Philharmonic Orchestra, both of which are box office sellouts. He records extensively for Guild Music, winning the top double five-star award from Classic CD Magazine and he is sponsored by the leading American string manufacturer D'Addario.

 "Really Big Swans" (Tchaikovsky "Four Little Swans")
 "Tootin' Carmen" (Bizet "Habanera" from Carmen)
 "Ladies on Lavender" (Nigel Hess "Ladies in Lavender")
 "Deviations" (Paganini "24th Caprice")
 "Tocata in Fog" - written by Dave Williams
 "Les Belles" (Mike Oldfield "Tubular Bells")
 "She Too" - written by Dave Williams
 "Albert Ross" (Fleetwood Mac "Albatross") - written by Peter Green
 "Medication" (Jules Massenet "Meditation" from Thais)
 "Swan Fake" (Tchaikovsky "Swan Lake")
 "The List" (John Williams "Schindler's List")
 "Nuclear" - written by Dave Williams
 "Dear Old Swanney" (Saint-Saëns "The Swan")
 "Frogger" (Harold Faltermeyer "Axel F")
 "O2" (Jean Michel Jarre "Oxygene")
 "Barking" (Bach "Presto" from Sonata in G minor)
 "The Car Men" (Bizet "Carmen")

Adeste Fiddles
 The First Noel 4:00	
 The Dance of the Sugar Plum Fairy 3:04	
 Ave Maria 4:23	
 God Rest Ye Merry Gentleman 3:36	
 Favorite Things 3:12	
 Silent Night 4:22	
 Celtic Christmas 3:38	
 We Three Kings 3:22	
 Adeste Fiddles (Oh Come All Ye Faithful) 3:44	
 I Saw Three Ships 3:10	
 The Coventry Carol (Lu lay lu lah) 3:31	
 The Holly and the Ivy 3:20	
 Hark the Herald Angels Sing 2:51	
 Here We Come A Wassailing 2:08	
 Oh Holy Night 3:52	
 Ding Dong Merrily On High 3:09

Ivory Bow
 Pavanorama	04:42
 Celtic Frock	03:39
 Carmen Over To My Place	02:04
 Bolero	06:51
 Flight Of The Crimson Queen	03:27
 Arabian Knights	03:52
 Canned Rock	04:48
 The Ivory Bow	04:37
 Big Bad Bumble	02:03
 Edelweiss	03:08
 Carmen Electro	02:45
 The Lying King	04:13
 Camera Gazing	03:04
 Dance Of The Rude Peeps	03:14
 Oh, Eso Es Un Castillo Bonito	03:21
 Gypsy Cream	03:38
 Ave Maria	03:36

References
Neurodisc Records Official Site

External links
 Deviations Project Myspace
 Neurodisc Records Official Site

British electronic music groups